Rain Of Hope is a 2016 Nollywood drama film directed by Iyke Odife.

Plot
When the king dies, the prince must take his place but not without a wife. He proposes to his fiancee and she begins to show her other sides. The prince decides to ride a bicycle as a commoner and meets a lady and falls in love with her, but the evil people surrounding the prince cause havoc in the palace in order to stop the prince from marrying his new found love

Cast
Yul Edochie as Prince Okiki
Chioma Chukwuka as Mukosolu
 Ruth Kadiri as Kanyira
 Chinyere Wilfred as Queen Vera
 Shirley Igwe as Princess Jane
 Ekechi Nweje as Maria
 Emma Umeh as Igwemba

Nigerian drama films
2016 films
English-language Nigerian films
2010s English-language films